Al-Nābighah, al-Nābighah al-Dhubiyānī, or  Nābighah al-Dhubyānī; real name Ziyad ibn Muawiyah; was one of the last Arabian poets of pre-Islamic times. "Al-Nabigha" means "genius or intelligent" in Arabic.

His tribe, the Banu Dhubyan, belonged to the district near Mecca, but he spent most of his time at the courts of Hirah and Ghassan. In Hira he remained under Mundhir III, and then his successor in 562.

After a sojourn at the court of Ghassan, he returned to Hirah under Numan III. Owing to his verses written about the Queen he was compelled to flee to Ghassan, but returned ca., 600. When Numan died five years later he withdrew to his own tribe.

His date-of-death is uncertain, but seems to predate Islam. His poems consist largely of eulogies and satires, and are concerned with the strife of Hirah and Ghassan, and of the Banu Abs and the Banu Dhubyan. He is one of the six eminent pre-Islamic poets whose poems were collected before the middle of the 2nd century of Islam, and have been regarded as the standard of Arabic poetry; some writers consider him the first of the six. These poets have written long poems comparable to epic poems, known as Muʿallaqat (معلقات) since they were hung on the walls of the Kaaba for all to admire and read.

His poems were edited by Wilhelm Ahlwardt in the Diwans of the Six Ancient Arabic Poets (London, 1870), and separately by H. Derenbourg (Paris, 1869, a reprint from the Journal asiatique for 1868).

References

535 births
604 deaths
Arab Christians in Mesopotamia
6th-century Arabic poets
Ghatafan